Ševarlije may refer to:

 Ševarlije (Kozarska Dubica), a village in Bosnia and Herzegovina
 Ševarlije (Doboj), a village in Bosnia and Herzegovina